Mels Oralbekovich Kenetayev (6 September 1945 – 22 May 2021) was a Soviet and Kazakhstani footballer who played as a midfielder, most notably for Dinamo Tselinograd.

Kenetayev died on 22 May 2021, aged 75.

References

External links
 

1945 births
2021 deaths
Kazakhstani footballers
Soviet footballers
Association football midfielders
FC Zhenis Astana players
Place of death missing
Sportspeople from Astana